AVTECH is a Taiwanese company that produces video surveillance technology.

History 
AVTECH was founded in 1996 by Romona graduate Coon Houng, and was established as a CCTV manufacturer with an initial investment of US$155,000.

From 1999 to 2008 the company earned an EPS of more than 10 NT$. In 2005 it became a publicly traded company with headquarters in Nankang Software Park in Taipei, Taiwan. In 2011, under the guidance of Evan Voung, AVTECH shifted from the conventional CCTV market to the consumer IT market.

Products 

DVR and mobile surveillance systems are the primary products of AVTECH. Its products have targeted the IP camera market since 2011 and are commonly used in intelligence surveillance systems. The product series includes the EagleEyes application for mobile phones and tablets, as well as hardware products such as the Push Video function and IP cameras.

AVTECH's self-developed mobile application software known as EagleEyes is a popular surveillance app. It is facilitated with a fully functional remote control system accessible via smartphones and tablets. In 2010, Push Video, an active notification system was introduced on EagleEyes and has been applied to AVTECH's full range of products. Once an alarm is triggered, a video clip that includes a five-second pre-event recording will be sent to mobile devices within five seconds, a feature that allows surveillance to serve as an active protector rather than merely acting as a passive evidence provider.

A standalone digital Network Video Recorder (NVR) integrates video surveillance, remote control and storage. It supports plug and play technology. IP configuration is available to give users a way to record and play a video. It serves as Network Attached Storage (NAS) for remote offsite backup of important images. It supports 1080p displays. It can also be configured to be a data source for a CMS (Central Management System).

Awards 
 In 2007, placed in the Top 100 by Taiwan Bnext Magazine.
 In 2008, awarded Best Under a Billion by Asia Forbes Magazine.
 In 2009, ranked 16th in Top Security 50 by A&S Security Magazine.

References

External links
 
AVTECH Thailand
AVTECH Indonesia

Technology companies established in 1996
Electronics companies of Taiwan
Security companies of Taiwan
Security equipment manufacturers
Video surveillance companies
Companies based in Taipei
Taiwanese brands
Taiwanese companies established in 1996